The University of Toronto is a public research university located principally in Toronto, Ontario, Canada. 

The University of Toronto may also refer to the following:
  One of the university's two suburban campuses:
 University of Toronto Scarborough, located in Scarborough, Toronto, Ontario, Canada
 University of Toronto Mississauga, located in Mississauga, Ontario, Canada
 University of Toronto Schools, a university-preparatory and laboratory school affiliated with the University of Toronto 
 University of Toronto Press, an affiliated publishing house, sometimes referred to simply as University of Toronto in bibliographical citations